Jerzy Browkin (5 November 1934 – 23 November 2015) was a Polish mathematician, studying mainly algebraic number theory. He was a professor at the Institute of Mathematics of the Polish Academy of Sciences. In 1994, together with Juliusz Brzeziński, he formulated the n-conjecture—a version of the abc conjecture involving n > 2 integers.

References 

1934 births
2015 deaths
20th-century Polish mathematicians
21st-century  Polish  mathematicians
Number theorists